Suryamal Misran (also spelled Suryamall Meesan; 1815–1868) was the Rajkavi (poet-historian) of Bundi kingdom. He hailed from the Meesan lineage of Charans. He was proficient in six languages including Dingal, Sanskrit, Prakrit, Apabhraṃśa, and was a scholar of grammar, logic, history and politics. His important works include Vansh Bhaskar, Vir Satsai, Balwant Vilas and Chhandomayukh.

Early life and family 
The great poet-historian of Rajasthan, Suryamal Misran was born in Harna village of Bundi district on 19 October 1815 AD(V.S. 1872).  His father's name was Chandi Dan and his mother's name was Bhawani Bai. His father was a prolific scholar and talented poet of his time. Vishnu Singh, the then Maharaja of Bundi, had conferred the fiefdom of a village, Lakh Pasav, and the title of Kaviraja to Chandi Dan. Chandi Dan composed three texts of utmost importance, namely Balavigraha, Saar Sagar, and Vanshabharan.

Education 
Suryamal was endowed with sharp acumen and extraordinary memory since childhood.  He acquired deep knowledge of many disciplines in his childhood. Having been educated by the leading scholars of his age, Suryamal Misran was well-versed in astronomy, religion, culture, astrology, philosophy, and several languages, in addition to possessing exceptional literary gifts. His deep inclination towards music is reflected by the fact that he usually carried a Veena with him.Experts were brought in to tutor Suryamal Misran in traditional education prevalent at that time in Indian society. Swami Swarupadas gave him training in Yoga, Vedanta, Nyaya, and Vaiseshika literature. From Pandit Ashanand, he learned grammar, verses, poetry, astrology, Ashvadhak, and Chanakya Shastra. From Muhammad, he learned veena-playing and Persian from another mentor. From another Muslim teacher, he acquired some knowledge about Islamic culture and had read some Persian histories like the Tarikh-i-Firishta and the Akbar-Nama by Abul-Fazl. Thus, Suryamal Misran received an educational, literary, and historical atmosphere right from the beginning, giving rise to a unique confluence of knowledge, wisdom, and valor. During his lifetime, his poetry had become popular all over Rajasthan and Malwa.

Career 
He wrote primarily in Dingal, though he also made occasional use of Sanskrit, Prakrit, Magadhi, Pingal and other dialects.

Misran was a court poet(Raj-Kavi) of the Bundi kingdom, which was ruled by  Hada Chauhans. In the poetry world, they are known as "Mahakavi". He undertook the work Vans Bhaskar  during the reign of Maharao Ram Singh. He intended to write Vans Bhaskar in two volumes and twelve parts as an analogy with the sun, which has two solstices and twelve months in a year. He left the work unfinished at the eighth part of the second volume because of differences with his king, whose territory became a British protectorate, while the poet supported the Indian Rebellion of 1857.

Suryamal Misran felt moved by the plight of ordinary Rajput soldiers. In at least three couplets of Veer Satsai he expressed his concern for the wives of brave soldiers, who asked the queen for a handful of grains against the promise of their husbands' heads rolling before hers, whenever needed in return. Veer-Satsai is a soulful expression of the hopes and aspirations of the valiant Rajasthani Warriors and their spouses. It sings of those who indulged unflinchingly in the dangerous game of defiance and death, preferring extinction with honour to a life of slavery and shame.

Misran's glorification of local heroes helped to develop the spirit of nationalization in Rajasthan.

Anti-British Sentiment 
Suryamal Misran was a proponent of resistance against colonial powers. In his views, subjection to the British implied loss of dharma (faith and way of life). He warned that if the British stayed on no one would be jami ka thakur (lord of the land) and all would become Isai (Christian).

Suryamal wrote to most Kings and Thakurs of Rajputana to stand up against the British. He envisioned a coalition of the Hindu kings of India who would wage war and drive out the British once and for all.

During the 1857 war against the British, Suryamal celebrated the courage of the Auwa Thakur Kushal Singh who had given shelter to the Purabia soldiers of the Jodhpur Legion which had rebelled against the British East India Company and were marching from Sirohi towards British India.

Death 
Although Suryamal had no dearth of wealth and resources he spent his days depressed because he had no children, he felt suffocated by the growing hold of British power over India. The last days of his life were spent in a crisis. He found shelter in music and alcohol, he was immersed in alcohol by night, and alcohol made him diseased, gradually his body became thin and he succumbed to death. In this way, he died in Bundi on 11 October 1868(VS 1925 Ashadh Krishna Ekadashi). His death was mourned by the people and nobles of Rajasthan and Malwa, many poems were written as a tribute to him.

Legacy 
Throughout his life, Suryamal Misran married six times. His first wedding was attended by Maharao Ram Singh, the King of Bundi himself.

He was highly respected in scholarly and intellectual circles. He was counted among the five gems(panch-ratna) of Bundi. His epic creation "Vansh Bhaskar" book also remained incomplete, which was later completed by his adopted son Murari Dan.

Suryamal Misran is often referred to by Indian scholars as the ‘Veda Vyas’ of the recent modern period, in that his Vansha Bhaskar is regarded as an epic on par with Mahabharata.

Dr. Ramdhari Singh 'Dinkar' says “The glory of Suryamall Ji is that he was a great national poet, the letters he wrote to the kings and royal men at the time of war of 1857, clearly show that his heart was in pain for the country, yearning for independence, and wanted all the kings together to drive the British out of the country.”

Vansha Bhaskar 

In the 19th century, publication of Vansh Bhaskar proved to be disruptive for bardic poetry in Bundi.Its publication has very nearly killed Bardic activity at Bundi, because every poet I met with recited verses from the Vamsabhaskar. I enquired about old families of bards, but I was told that during the last 70 years their libraries have been dissipated. In fact, I was shown a huge mass of loose pages of a collection of Bardic songs purchased from a Bania for two pice.Works of Suryamal Misran remained influential even after a century. Gyasiram Misra(from Mathura) who was given the same position in Bundi Court based his work Vamsa Pradipaka on Suryamal’s Vansh Bhaskar.

Works 
Prominent compositions by Suryamal Misran are:

 Vansh Bhaskar 
  Veer Satsai 
  Dhatu Roopawali 
  Balwad Vilas (Balwant Vilas) 
  Ram Ranjat 
  Chhand Mayukh 
  Sati Raso 
  Sati Sujas

Suryamal Mishran Shikhar award 

Suryamal Mishran Shikhar Award, in the memory of the 19th century poet-historian Suryamal Misran, is given on the basis of the commendation of the committee constituted by Rajasthani Bhasha Sahitya and Sanskriti Akademi, Bikaner (Government of Rajasthan) for special contribution to Rajasthani literature.

In popular culture
In recent years, his persona has been staged in theatre, most notably in Rajendra Panchal's 'Katha Sukavi Suryamall Ki' performed by the Perafin group of Kota.

References

Poets from Rajasthan
Rajasthani-language writers
Indian people of the Indian Rebellion of 1857
1815 births
1863 deaths
People from Bundi district
19th-century Indian poets
Charan
Dingal poets